Statistics of Ekstraklasa for the 1933 season.

Overview
It was contested by 12 teams, and Ruch Chorzów won the championship.

First phase

Eastern Group

Results

Western Group

Results

Final phase

Championship group

Results

Relegation group

Results

Promotion/relegation playoffs

References
Poland - List of final tables (RSSSF)

Ekstraklasa seasons
1
Pol
Pol